The scaly-headed triplefin, Karalepis stewarti, is a triplefin, the only species in the genus Karalepis. It is endemic to New Zealand where it is found around  North Island, South Island, the Three Kings Islands, Snares Island and Stewart Island. The specific name honours Andy Stewart of the Department of Fishes at the National Museum of New Zealand.

References

External references
 

Tripterygiidae
Endemic marine fish of New Zealand
Fish described in 1984